Kenneth Kenkichi Kurihara was a distinguished professor of economic theory at the State University of New York. He was a noted post-Keynesian economist who worked on Keynesian dynamics, growth, development economics and monetary theory and public policy. He was born in Kutchan, Hokkaido Japan but moved to the US where he worked first for the government as a research economist, then as an academic at Princeton University, Rutgers University and then at the State University of New York.

Kurihara was born in Kutchan, Hokkaido, Japan . He died 13 June 1972 at Our Lady of Lourdes Hospital, Binghamton, New York.

Selected publications 
Kurihara, K. K. (1956). Introduction to Keynesian dynamics. New York: Columbia University.

References

1910s births
1972 deaths
Growth economists
Japanese economists
20th-century American economists
People from Hokkaido
Japanese emigrants to the United States
State University of New York faculty